Engelbrekt Parish is a parish in Östermalm's church district (kontrakt) in the Diocese of Stockholm, Sweden. The parish is located in Stockholm Municipality in Stockholm County. The parish forms its own pastorship.

History
Engelbrekt Parish was formed on 1 May 1906 (by decision of 15 April 1904) through an outbreak of Hedvig Eleonora Parish. The parish has composed its own pastorship since 1 May 1906.

Location
Engelbrekt Parish includes covers an area from the northern tip of Ålkistan, the eastern tip of Värtahamnen and the southern tip of Stureplan. The border with Stockholm City Centre follows Tegeluddsvägen, Lidingövägen, Brahegatan and Birger Jarlsgatan.

References

External links

Parishes of the Church of Sweden
Diocese of Stockholm (Church of Sweden)